Goran Ivanišević was the defending champion but lost in the semifinals to Andre Agassi.

Agassi won in the final 7–6(7–4), 4–6, 6–2, 6–3 against Michael Stich.

Seeds

  Goran Ivanišević (semifinals)
  Michael Stich (final)
  Andre Agassi (champion)
  Thomas Muster (semifinals)
  Petr Korda (quarterfinals)
  Andrea Gaudenzi (quarterfinals)
  Slava Doseděl (first round)
  Bernd Karbacher (first round)

Draw

Final

Section 1

Section 2

External links
 1994 CA-TennisTrophy draw

Singles